Jennifer T. Macdonald is an American conceptual artist whose work explores the artifices and tropes used in the construction of language and meaning at the intersection of law, gender identity, sexual orientation and desire.

Macdonald, together with partner Hillary Leone, worked under the collaborative name of Leone and Macdonald for slightly over a decade in the 1990s. Within the group of self-identified LGBT artists working in the American art scene, a number of gay male collaborative teams had established renown during this period, but  Leone & Macdonald were arguably the first American lesbian art duo to do likewise. Known for their visually seductive but often politically pointed pieces, Leone & Macdonald were also among the first women to address AIDS directly in their work.

Early life and career
Born in New York City, Jennifer Macdonald is the daughter of the American poet Cynthia Macdonald. Macdonald attended   Brown University and graduated from The School of Visual Arts with honors before starting to collaborate with Leone in the late 1980s. Macdonald was an adjunct professor at Hunter College and a visiting professor at universities such as New York University, Massachusetts Institute of Technology, University of California at San Diego, Columbia University, and School of the Art Institute of Chicago. Leone & Macdonald are two-time National Endowments for the Arts grant recipients, three-time Art Matters Foundation Fellowship recipients, Penny McCall Foundation Grant and Joan Mitchell Foundation Grant recipients.

Exhibitions (selection)
 1999 Henry Art Gallery, Faye G. Allen Center for the Visual Arts, Seattle (solo retrospective)
 1998 Whitney Museum of American Art, New York
 1998 The Andy Warhol Museum, Pittsburgh
 1998 Contemporary Arts Museum, Houston
 1997 The Australian Center for Photography, Sydney, Australia (solo)
 1997 Rena Bransten Gallery, San Francisco (solo)
 1997 Monash University Gallery, Melbourne
 1997 Whitney Museum of American Art, New York
 1996 Arthouse Multimedia Centre for the Arts, Dublin, Ireland (solo)
 1996 Crawford Municipal Art Gallery, Cork, Ireland (solo)
 1996 David Winton Bell Gallery, Brown University
 1995 Fawbush Gallery, New York (solo) 
 1994 Whitney Museum of American Art
 1995 Greg Kucera Gallery, Seattle
 1994 Fogg Art Museum, Harvard University, Cambridge
 1994 National Museum of Modern and Contemporary Art, Seoul, Korea (portfolio)
 1994 Snug Harbor Cultural Center, New York
 1993 Whitney Biennial 1993, Whitney Museum of American Art
 1993 National Museum of Modern and Contemporary Art, Seoul, Korea
 1993 Museo Statale d'Arte Medioevale e Moderna, Arezzo, Italy
 1993 Makuhari Messe, Tokyo
 1993 The Drawing Center, New York
 1993 Aspen Art Museum, Aspen
 1992 The School of the Art Institute of Chicago
 1991 MoMA PS1
 1991 Pence Gallery, Los Angeles
 1991 La Sala Mendoza, Caracas, Venezuela
 1991 Art in General, New York
 1991 Denver Art Museum, Denver
 1989 Grey Art Gallery and Study Center, New York
 1988 Los Angeles Contemporary Exhibitions (LACE)

Written works
 Waldrop, R. & Macdonald, J. (1990). Peculiar Motions. Berkeley: Kelsey St. Press. .
 Macdonald, J. & Leone, H. (1996). Passing. Miami: Miami-Dade Community College. ASIN: B003ZIOQZY
 Macdonald, J. & Leone, H. (1995). Questions of Feminism. October 71, Published by the MIT Press.

Notes

References
 Whitney Museum of American Art. (1993). 1993 Biennal Exhibition. New York, Abrams. 
  Plimpton, G. (1994). Leone & Macdonald d.b.: An Interview with Art Portfolio. Paris Review, Vol. 36, Issue 132, pp. 133–161
 Fredericksen, E. (1999) Two of a kind. The Stranger, July 15.
 Lord, C. & Meyer, R. (2013). Art & Queer Culture. New York: Phaidon. 
 Hammond, H. (2000). Lesbian Art in America. New York: Rizzo International Publications. 
 Spice, N. (1995). The Bare Fork. Leone & Macdonald. Art+Text, vol. 51, pp. 50–55.
 Enright, R. (1996). Visual Pleasures. Border Crossings, Vol. 15, Issue 3, p7.
 Turner, E. (1996) What's in a look? Miami Herald, February 10.
 Turner, E. (1996) Splash, Color, and Rhythm. ARTnews, January.
 Wolfsenberger, B. (1994) Women, Bodies, and Art, Boston Phoenix, April 22.
 Lovett, M. (1996). Leone & Macdonald, CIRCA Art Magazine, Vol. 78.
 Fuchs, B. (2003). Passing for Spain: Cervantes And the Fictions of Identity. Illinois: University of Illinois. Press 

American conceptual artists
Women conceptual artists
Year of birth missing (living people)
Living people
Artists from New York City
School of Visual Arts alumni
21st-century American women artists
American lesbian artists